The Maidford River is a river in the U.S. state of Rhode Island. It flows . There is one dam along the river's length.

Course
The river rises from an unnamed pond north of Wyatt Road in Middletown. From there, it flows due south along Paradise Avenue to Sachuest Point where the river turns east and flows into the Sakonnet River.

Crossings
Below is a list of all crossings over the Maidford River. The list starts at the headwaters and goes downstream.
Middletown
Wyatt Road
Berkeley Avenue
Green End Avenue
Prospect Avenue
Paradise Avenue
Hanging Rocks Road
Third Beach Road

Tributaries
Parardise Brook is the Maidford River's only tributary, named or unnamed.

See also
List of rivers in Rhode Island

References
Maps from the United States Geological Survey

Rivers of Newport County, Rhode Island
Rivers of Rhode Island